Route 277 is a two-lane north/south highway in the Chaudière-Appalaches region in the province of Quebec, Canada. Its northern terminus is in Saint-Henri at the junction of Route 173 and its southern terminus is in Sainte-Aurélie at the junction of Route 275.

Towns along Route 277

 Saint-Henri-de-Levis
 Saint-Anselme
 Sainte-Claire
 Saint-Malachie
 Saint-Leon de Standon
 Lac-Etchemin
 Sainte-Rose-de-Watford
 Saint-Louis-de-Gonzague
 Sainte-Aurélie

See also
 List of Quebec provincial highways

References

External links 
 Provincial Route Map (Courtesy of the Quebec Ministry of Transportation) 
 Route 277 on Google Maps

277